Federico Lunardi (7 December 1880 – 9 November 1954) was an Italian prelate of the Catholic Church who spent most of his career in the diplomatic service of the Holy See, serving also in the Roman Curia.

Biography
Federico Lunardi was born in Livorno, Italy, on 7 November 1880. He was ordained a priest on 30 March 1907.

On 13 December 1936, Pope Pius XI named him a titular archbishop and Apostolic Nuncio to Bolivia. He received his episcopal consecration from Archbishop Benedetto Aloisi Masella on 12 December 1936.

On 31 October 1938, Pope Pius appointed him Apostolic Nuncio to Honduras.

In December 1947, Pope Pius XII moved him to the Roman Curia, assigning him to the Secretariat of State.

Lunardi was a trained ethnologist and amateur archeologist. In 1948 he published his most important work, a study of the archeology of Honduras.

On 8 July 1949, Pope John Paul returned him to the diplomatic corps, appointing him Apostolic Nuncio to Paraguay.

Lunardi died in Asunción on 9 November 1954 following an operation.

References

Additional sources

External links
Catholic Hierarchy: Archbishop Federico Lunardi 

1880 births
1954 deaths
Apostolic Nuncios to Bolivia
Apostolic Nuncios to Honduras
Apostolic Nuncios to Paraguay
Officials of the Roman Curia
People from Livorno